Ivana Sekyrová, née Rubášová  (born 13 October 1971 in Klatovy), is a Czech long-distance runner. She competed in the marathon at the 2012 Summer Olympics, placing 67th with a time of 2:37:14.

References

1971 births
Living people
Czech female long-distance runners
Olympic athletes of the Czech Republic
Athletes (track and field) at the 2012 Summer Olympics
People from Klatovy
Sportspeople from the Plzeň Region